Arys (Arys, ارىس ; , earlier Арысь Aryś), is a town in Turkistan Region of Kazakhstan. Population:  

Arys is the junction of two important rail lines: Trans-Aral Railway (Orenburg-Arys-Tashkent) and Turkestan-Siberia Railway (Arys-Almaty-Barnaul). The Arys station was built ca. 1904 as a station on the Trans-Aral line; a number of buildings and structures dating to 1902–1905 are preserved in the city.  In 1932 Arys was granted the status of a work settlement, and in 1956, that of a city.

The economy of Arys is centered on agriculture (grain, cotton, livestock). There are some industries as well, mostly having to do with the city's railroad origin: a railroad tie factory, an electric locomotive repair plant, and another one for the repair of railroad cargo cars.

References 

Populated places in Turkistan Region
Populated places established in 1902